Pilar de Lusarreta (1914–1967) was an Argentine author and critic. She coauthored several works with Arturo Cancela.

1914 births
1967 deaths
Place of birth missing
20th-century Argentine women writers
20th-century Argentine writers